Tustna is a former municipality in Møre og Romsdal county, Norway. The administrative centre was the village of Gullstein. The municipality is located in the present-day Aure Municipality. The municipality included the main islands of Tustna, Stabblandet, and Solskjelsøya, as well as many smaller, surrounding islets between the Edøyfjorden and the Vinjefjorden.

History
Tustna was originally a part of the municipality of Edøy (see formannskapsdistrikt).  A meeting held on 17 March 1863 decided to build a church on the island of Tustern (which was the name of the island at that time) and thereby gain status as a separate parish within the large municipality.  Gullstein Church was built in the village of Gullstein on the eastern side of the island in 1864.  A royal resolution of 3 May 1873 directed that the parish of Tustern be separated from Edøy Municipalit to create a separate municipality effective on 1 January 1874. The new municipality had an initial population of 1,179.

During the 1960s, there were many municipal mergers across Norway due to the work of the Schei Committee. On 1 January 1965, the part of Tustna on the island of Ertvågsøy (population: 85) was transferred to neighboring Aure Municipality to the east. On 1 January 2006, all of Tustna Municipality was merged into Aure Municipality. At its end, Tustna had a population of 1,006.

Coat of arms
The coat of arms for Tustna was blue with a gold klippfisk in the center.  This symbolizes the importance of fishing for this type of fish in the municipality.

Name
The municipality was named after the island of Tustna, the main island for the municipality. The name of the island was first mentioned, as Toester, on a Dutch map from 1623. It may be derived from the Old Norse word  which means "staff" or "stick", and in that case it is probably referring to the form of one of the mountains on the island.

Government
The municipal council  of Tustna was made up of representatives that were elected to four year terms.  The party breakdown of the final municipal council was as follows:

See also
List of former municipalities of Norway

References

Aure, Norway
Nordmøre
Former municipalities of Norway
1874 establishments in Norway
2006 disestablishments in Norway